Ana María Raga (Caracas, Venezuela, December 16, 1967) is a Venezuelan musician, choir and orchestra director, pianist, arranger, composer and teacher. She has won national and international prizes in the field of choral singing. She is the founder and president of the Aequalis Foundation.

Choirs directed by her:
Aequalis Aurea, female voices
Colegio Humboldt Choral Project, children and adolescents (between 4 and 17 years)
MonteAvila University Choir
Schola Cantorum de Venezuela, formerly Schola Cantorum de Caracas which she directs with Maria Guinand

Training
Raga started her training as a musician at the “Juan Manuel Olivares” Music School and obtained her Piano Performer degree in 1990 under the tutelage of Marisa Romera. She holds a bachelor's degree in Choral Conducting from the University Institute for Musical Studies (today Universidad de las Artes (UNEARTE) [University of the Arts]) obtained under the guidance of Alberto Grau. Raga has taken Composition and Choral Conducting Courses given by internationally recognized masters and professors such as Alberto Grau, Vic Nees, Robert Sund. Willy Gohl, Werner Pfaff, Erkki Pohjola, Helmuth Rilling and Frieder Bernius and Orchestral Conducting with Helmuth Rilling and Alfredo Rugeles. In 2013 she obtained her master's degree in Orchestral Conducting from the Simón Bolívar University (Caracas, Venezuela). Her graduate work was distinguished with a special mention and recommendation for publication. Currently she is studying for a post graduate degree in Music Therapy at the Universidad de los Andes.

Academic and educational work
Professor Raga is a member of the Universidad de las Artes (UNEARTE) faculty where she teaches choral conducting. Furthermore, she collaborates as a professor training directors of children and youth choirs with the “Social Action through Music Program” sponsored by the Development Bank of Latin America (formerly known as Andean Development Corporation) in 8 countries. She has been a consultant to the Misión Música, managed by the Fundación Musical Simón Bolívar, also known as Fundación del Estado para el Sistema Nacional de Orquestas Juveniles e Infantiles de Venezuela (FESNOJIV) [National System of Youth and Children's Orchestras of Venezuela] for the development of a “Symphonic Choirs System”.

As a guest conductor and pedagogue Raga participates in numerous festivals and events in Europe, Asia, North and South America. In Venezuela she gives courses for Children Choir Directors in Caracas and the interior. She has held workshops on Children Choral Repertoire at the IV América Cantat (Caracas, Venezuela), at the IV Junior Europa Cantat (Vic, Spain) and at the V America Cantat (La Habana, Cuba, 2007) festivals. In Hungary she has given courses on Latin-American Children Choir Music for students of Choir Direction at the Liszt Academy of Music in collaboration with the Hungarian Radio Children's Choir (Budapest, Hungary, 2006). She has been invited to present workshops for children choir directors in León, Guanajuato, Mexico (2006) and on Latin-American Repertoire for Female Voices at the Busan Choral Festival and Competition in Korea (2007). In 2008 she attended an invitation to work with the choirs of the North American Choral Company in Grand Rapids, Michigan, USA and at the Sixth International Cedros UP Festival (FICUP) she held workshops for choir directors and on Latin-American Children Choir Music. In 2009 she participated as a workshop leader in the fields of Children Choir Direction and Vocal Technique at the 13th edition of the Ágora Vocal Technique and Choir Direction Courses in Segovia, Spain, organized by the Ágora Choir and sponsored by the Don Juan de Borbón Foundation. In 2010 and 2011 she organized a workshop on Latin-American Music for Mixed Choirs at the Alpe Adria Cantat Festival in Lignano, Italy. Also in 2011 she held workshops at the Europa Cantat Junior Festival in Estonia. In August 2012 she held a workshop on Old Latin American Music at the Europa Cantat Festival in Turin. In 2012 and 2013 she led the training workshops offered by NEOJIBA, the System for Orchestras and Choirs of Salvador de Bahia, Brazil. In 2013 she held workshops for the music school network in Medellín, Colombia.

Under her guidance, the Aequalis Foundation initiated in September 2012 a program of workshops and courses in continuing education for choir directors and choir singers in order to enhance their respective capabilities and performance, especially if they have not had any formal training.

She set up and worked for many years in the development of the Schola Foundation children choirs, “Pequeños Cantores de la Schola”, which currently constitute the program “Construir Cantando”.

In July 2009, the International Federation for Choral Music (IFCM) invited her to join its organizing committee and to participate as a speaker at the International Music Education and Singing Conference. Her presentation dealt with the Social Impact of Choral Singing and offered valuable insights from projects in Venezuela and the Andean region. Furthermore, she collaborates with international choral music research journals and publishers (see Publications). Under the auspices of the Aequalis Foundation and the IFCM she presented a poster on the same topic at the World Forum on Music organized by the International Council for Music in September 2011. More recently, in October 2013, she held a conference on Choir Singing, Social Capital and Human Development at the National Seminar on Music Education and Pedagogy organized by the Network of Music Schools in Medellín, Colombia.

She collaborates with international choral music and research publications (see Publications).

Choirs
Raga has set up children choirs such as the Mater Salvatoris Children Choir and the "Pequeños Cantores de Altagracia". The latter one is the second choir that was created within the Schola Cantorum de Venezuela Foundation's “Pequeños Cantores” project, an educational initiative with a social component directed at children and adolescents. The Aequalis and Voces Prismas choirs for female voices were set up by Raga under the Aequalis Foundation umbrella. These two choirs have since merged to become the Aequalis Aurea Choir. Since 2003 Raga has been responsible for the Choral Project at the Humboldt School in Caracas. Since 1990 she has been directing the Schola Cantorum de Venezuela together with the director María Guinand.

Together with Professor Luimar Arismendi, she started the Schola Cantorum Youth Choir. It is the leading choir of all the Schola Cantorum de Venezuela Foundation children choir projects. Under Raga's and Arismendi's leadership, the choir has attained a level of excellence permitting it to participate in important international activities in recent years. Raga was its director until 2010.

Awards and Career Development as a Director

AWARDS
 Mention at the XXII Ciutat de Reus Composition for Children Choir Prize, Spain, 2012
 Audience Award. Humboldt School Choir. Lead Director. Festival D’Canto, Margarita, Venezuela, 2006
 Audience Award, Vicace 2001 Festival. Aequalis Choir. Lead Director. Veszprém, Hungary. 2001
 First Prize in the Folklore Music Category, International Des Moines Festival. Mater Salvatoris Choir. Lead Director. Iowa, USA, 1999.
 First Prize in the Choir Category, International Des Moines Festival. Mater Salvatoris Choir. Lead Director. Iowa, USA, 1999.
 2nd Prize in Composition for Mixed Choirs at the 1st Procter & Gamble de Venezuela Choir Festival, 1991.
 Guido D'Arezzo Prize as Choir Singer of the Cantoría Alberto Grau, directed by María Guinand, Italy, 1989.
 Sole Spanish Music Prize at the National Silvia Eisenstein Piano Competition, Caracas, 1987.
CAREER DEVELOPMENT
Ana María Raga initiated her career as a choir director in the 1980s, having founded at a very young age different choirs with which she obtained very quickly international recognition. She now has over 20 years of experience in the leadership of different types of groups of same and mixed voices. She has been working with all ages (from children to senior adults) and populations at risk (children and adolescents from disadvantaged social groups in various Latin American countries, female penitentiary population at the Los Teques – INOF prison).
She has been guest director of internationally renowned groups such as the Angelica Girls’ choir from Budapest and the Hungarian Radio Children Choir. She was a guest director at the World Youth Choir in 2009, an annual event of the International Federation for Choral Music (IFCM), Jeunesses Musicales International (JMI) and Europa Cantat (EC). The UNESCO Ambassador Project brings together young singers (between 17 and 26 years old), selected among the best choir singers from over 40 countries, touring various countries in Europe. Raga has been present on important international stages such as the Lincoln Center in New York and Bolívar Hall in London.
2013
POP ROCK A CORO [POP ROCK TO CHOIR]: an event presenting choral versions of rock and pop classics, two concerts were given at the UNEARTE Concert Hall and at the Aula Magna of the Humboldt Elementary, Middle and High School: Aequalis Aurea and Humboldt School Choir, accompanied by the instrumentalists Álvaro Falcón (electric guitar), Valeria Falcón (electric bass), Edgar Saume (drum set). Concerts: “Simil est regnum caelorum”, sacred renaissance and contemporary repertoire with the Schola Cantorum de Venezuela, presented at different locations in the city of Caracas. IX Intercollegiate Humboldt School Choir Festival presented in various Simón Bolívar University halls in Sartenejas. “Un Canto por la Paz” [A song for peace] with the Children Singers from Lara and the choirs of the Aequalis Foundation in El Hatillo. II Choir Meeting during Easter Week (two concerts as director of Aequalis Aurea and artistic director of the final staging of the sacred music workshop). Concerts in different halls across Caracas with Choirs of the Aequalis Foundation. University of the Arts Young Directors’ Festival, Artistic Coordination.
During this year, she offered workshops for the choirs of the NEOJIBA (Salvador de Bahía, Brazil) System and the Medellín Music School Network (Colombia).
2012
Guest Director at the Open Singing, Europa Cantat Festival, Turin, Italy. Cartagena Music Festival with the Schola Cantorum de Venezuela. Buenos Aires Tour with presentation at the Colón Theatre of the Schola Cantorum de Venezuela. Beijing International Choir Festival and First Word Summit of the IFCM with the Schola Cantorum de Venezuela. VIII Humoldt School Intercollegiate Choir Festival (Aequalis Foundation Choirs/Humboldt School), artistic director. “Impresiones del Alma” concert of poetry and sacred repertoire with the Schola Cantorum de Venezuela, Lutheran Church, Caracas. 1st Choral Meeting during Easter Week (as director of Aequalis Aurea and Humboldt School Choir), Santa María Madre de Dios Church, Manzanares, Caracas.
2011
VII Humboldt School Intercollegiate Choir Festival with school choirs and orchestras. Staging of the choral symphony Gloria by Vivaldi with the Chacao Children Orchestra. Aequalis Foundation – Chacao Symphonic Orchestra Foundation. Directed the Symphonic Orchestra of Venezuela at two concerts from the series “Lo Nuestro”. Presented with Aequalis Aurea the show A TODO CANTO at the UNEARTE Concert Hall, Caracas. USA Tour with Schola Cantorum de Venezuela. Jury member of the 12th edition of the International Chamber Choir Competition Marktoberdorf, Germany.
2010
Los Angeles Tour, Alberto Arvelo Torrealba's Cantata Criolla, directed by Gustavo Dudamel, Osvaldo Golijov’s La Pasión según San Marcos and Schola Cantorum de Venezuela a capella concert. XVI Latin American Music Festival with Aequalis Aurea (first time that this choir receives an invitation to participate at this prestigious festival). Premier of the choral work “La Canción del Regreso” (composer Alberto Grau), a work for children choir, soloists and instrumental group with the participation of the Humboldt School Choir. VI Humboldt School Intercollegiate Choir Festival, artistic director. Participated with Aequalis Aurea at the IV Meeting of Equal Voices in Ciudad Guayana, Venezuela, organized by the Canticum Merú Choir Civil Association.
2009
XXV Canary Island Music Festival, Schola Cantorum de Venezuela. Guest Director at the Summer Session of the World Youth Choir, an annual event of the International Federation for Choral Music (IFCM), Jeunnesses Musicales International (JMI) and Europa Cantat (EC). The UNESCO Ambassador Project which in 2009 brought together 80 young singers (between 17 and 26 years old), selected among the best choir singers from over 40 countries, touring various European countries. Presented the show CONTRASTES with the Aequalis Aurea Choir at the Concert Hall of the Museum for Contemporary Art in Caracas. Premier in New York of the opera “A Flowering Tree” by John Adams and Peter Sellars, Schola Cantorum de Venezuela, Mostly Mozart Festival, Lincoln Center, Schola de Cantorum. V Humboldt School Intercollegiate Choir Festival, artistic director.
2008
Italy Tour. Alpe Adria Cantat Festival, Lignano. Concert in Treviso, Aequalis Aurea. 28th International Youth Festival in Ansbach, Germany. IV Humboldt School Intercollegiate Choir Festival, artistic director. Schola Cantorum de Venezuela Tour in Italy (Milan, Ferrara and Rome), associate director. Concerts in Caracas with the Aequalis Foundation Coirs and the Schola Cantorum de Venezuela.
2007
Mostly Mozart Festival, Lincoln Center in New York, Schola Cantorum de Venezuela. Recording in Longon of the John Adams Opera “A Flowering Tree”, produced by Peter Sellars, with the London Symphony Orchestra (Nonesuch Records), Schola Cantorum de Venezuela. Polyfollia Festival, France with a selection of children from the countries that participate in the Voces Andina a Coro Project (today Voces Latinas a Coro – CAF). III Humboldt School Intercollegiate Choir Festival, artistic director.
2006
Premier in Vienna of John Adams Opera, A Flowering Tree, produced by Peter Sellars. Schola Cantorum de Venezuela. USA – London Tour. Schola Cantorum de Venezuela. II Humboldt School Intercollegiate Choir Festival, artistic director. Young Directors’ Festival (IUDEM, today UNEARTE).
2005
Choir concerts with the Aequalis Foundation Choirs. I Humboldt School Intercollegiate Choir Festival, artistic director. Sacred Music Concert and Universal Repertoire Concert with Aequalis Aurea during the 5th Anniversary of the Aequalis Foundation, José Felix Ribas Hall, Teresa Carreño Theatre. Various Schola Cantorum de Venezuela Concerts. 500 Festival Sharing the Voices, St. John, Canada with the Schola Cantorum de Venezuela. Oregon Bach Festival, USA with the Schola Cantorum.
The first years
In August 2001 the Aequalis Choir goes on a successful tour in Europe, participating at the Vivace International Choral Festival in Veszprém, Hungary where the choir was rewarded with the Audience Prize, in Köszeg, Hungary at the László Lajtha Festival; at the 2nd International Girls’ Choir Festival in Riga, Letonia and the 7th Cristopher Summer Festival in Vilnius, Lithuania. In Hungary Raga directed together with Zsuzsana Graf the Aequalis Choir and the Angelica Girls' Choir from Budapest. During that tour, concerts were given in Vienna, Prague and Tallinn.
The Aequalis Choir was one of the choirs that represented Venezuela at the Songbird Project, organized by Erkki Pohjola.

The Aequalis Foundation
The Aequalis Foundation is a non-profit organization that was set up by Ana María Raga in 2001. It is dedicated to investigation and training in music, the promotion of music, in particular the practice of choral music as a tool of artistic and human development, enhancing the quality of life no matter at what stage in life. Through the Foundation, Raga promotes the right every person has to discover the music inside of oneself and its transformative powers. She teaches the art form, promoting the appreciation of every day beauty. This is favorable to health, the development of intelligence. It is a vehicle for socialization and the formation of the values of cohabitation and social integration; in short, it is about the positive impact of music on the quality of life as much on the individual as on the collective level. Raga conceives and offers training workshops for choir conductors and music teachers. She works to disseminate and create new choral repertoire, develop projects that enhance audience appreciation and musical expression. Her programs and activities are based on choral practice of children, young people and seniors, using strategies that enhance cognitive capabilities, psychomotor activities, stimulate different dimensions of intelligence and favor socialization.

The Aequalis Foundation has offered choral activities in places where music can provide tools for social reinsertion and integration. An example is the women penitentiary (INOF – Instituto Nacional de Orientación Femenina) in Los Teques where the foundation initiated the creation of prison orchestras and choirs. This project has since been assumed by FundaMusical Bolívar (former FESNOJIV) and extended to other prisons.

Since its creation, the foundation has promoted the set-up of children and youth choirs achieving national and international recognition. Currently the Foundation manages the Aequalis Aurea (female voices) and the Humboldt School Choir Project (for children and youth from 4 to 17 years old). The latter one constitutes the platform for the Intercollegiate Choir Festival that has been organized since 2005 pursuing greater visibility for and promotion of choral practice that takes place in schools.

Publications
Ana María Raga's creative work as a composer and arranger is centered on choral music. Some of her work has been published by Hinshaw Music, Inc. and Éditions À Coeur Joie. She has collaborated with Sounds in Europe, a publication of the European Music Council (Regional Group of the International Music Council) and with La Circular, a publication of the Secretariat for Children Choirs of Catalonia. Furthermore, she maintains her own blog, Sala de Ensayo, with articles and information about the choral world.

Current Events and Projects for 2012
 The Humboldt School Choir is one of two choirs from Latin America that have been invited to participate at the Internationales Chorfestival organized by the Dresden Philharmonic Orchestra in Dresden. It takes place in May 2014. This is the first time that groups from this continent have been invited to participate.
 Aequalis Aurea (female voices) has been invited to participate in the XIII Medellín Choir Festival “José María Bravo Márquez”.

External links
 Web de Ana María Raga
 Blog Sala de Ensayo
 Europa Cantat 2012
 International Chamber Choir Competition, Marktdorf, Germany
 Blog de Aequalis Aurea
 Blog del Proyecto Coral Colegio Humboldt
 Ana María Raga in Éditions A Coeur Joie
 Ana María Raga in Hinshaw Music
 Summer Session 2009
 Latin-American Music Festival, Concert Calendar
 Ana María Raga at the Schola Cantorum de Venezuela Foundation
 NYTimes: Passion, Through a Choir's Revelation
 Polyfollia: Pequeños Cantores de los Andes
 John Adams: A Flowering Tree
 Music Education and Singing Conference

1967 births
People from Caracas
Venezuelan conductors (music)
Venezuelan choral conductors
Living people
21st-century conductors (music)